A-kinase anchor protein 8 is an enzyme that, in humans, is encoded by the AKAP8 gene.

Function 

The A-kinase anchor proteins (AKAPs) are a group of structurally diverse proteins, which have the common function of binding to the regulatory subunit of protein kinase A (PKA) and confining it to discrete locations within the cell. This gene encodes a member of the AKAP family.  The encoded protein is located in the nucleus during interphase and is redistributed to distinct locations during mitosis. This protein has a cell cycle-dependent interaction with the RII subunit of PKA.

Interactions 

AKAP8 has been demonstrated to interact with:
 Cyclin D3 
 DDX5, 
 MCM2, 
 MYCBP,  and
 PRKAR2A.

References

Further reading

External links
 
 

A-kinase-anchoring proteins